Hemiconus lateralis is an extinct species of sea snail, a marine gastropod mollusk, in the family Conidae, the cone snails and their allies.

Distribution
Fossils of this marine species were found in France.

References

External links
 Tracey S., Craig B., Belliard L. & Gain O. (2017). One, four or forty species? - early Conidae (Mollusca, Gastropoda) that led to a radiation and biodiversity peak in the late Lutetian Eocene of the Cotentin, NW France. Carnets de Voyages Paléontologiques dans le Bassin Anglo-Parisien. 3: 1-38

lateralis
Gastropods described in 2017